On Top may refer to:

 On Top (film), a 1982 Icelandic comedy
 On Top (album), a 1966 album by the Four Tops
 On Top, a 1968 album by the Heptones
 On Top, a 2002 album by Rye Coalition
 "On Top" (Flume song), 2012
 "On Top" (Johnny Ruffo song), 2012
 "On Top" (Twista song), 2009
 "On Top", a song by the Killers from Hot Fuss

See also